İzmit Belediyespor is a Turkish women's basketball club based in İzmit, Turkey. The club was founded in 1995 and currently competing in the Women's Basketball Super League.

History
The club was invited to the Super League in 2018 after the Yakın Doğu Üniversitesi withdrew from the league. After playing in the 2020 Turkish Cup final, the club competed in the Euroleague in the 2020–21 season.

Current roster

Honours

Domestic competitions
 Federation Cup
 Champion: 2017–2018

References

External links
 Turkish Basketball Federation 
 Eurobasket team page

Women's basketball teams in Turkey
Sport in İzmit
Basketball teams established in 1995